Phillip James Edwin Peebles  (born April 25, 1935) is a Canadian-American astrophysicist, astronomer, and theoretical cosmologist who is currently the Albert Einstein Professor in Science, Emeritus, at Princeton University. He is widely regarded as one of the world's leading theoretical cosmologists in the period since 1970, with major theoretical contributions to primordial nucleosynthesis, dark matter, the cosmic microwave background, and structure formation.

Peebles was awarded half of the Nobel Prize in Physics in 2019 for his theoretical discoveries in physical cosmology. He shared the prize with Michel Mayor and Didier Queloz for their discovery of an exoplanet orbiting a sun-like star.  While much of his work relates to the development of the universe from its first few seconds, he is more skeptical about what we can know about the very beginning, and stated, "It's very unfortunate that one thinks of the beginning whereas in fact, we have no good theory of such a thing as the beginning."

Peebles has described himself as a convinced agnostic.

Early life 
Peebles was born on April 25, 1935 in St. Vital in present-day Winnipeg, Manitoba, Canada, the son of Ada Marion (Green), a homemaker, and Andrew Charles Peebles, who worked for the Winnipeg Grain Exchange. He completed his bachelor of science at the University of Manitoba. He then went on to pursue graduate studies at Princeton University, where he received his PhD in physics in 1962, completing a doctoral dissertation titled "Observational Tests and Theoretical Problems Relating to the Conjecture That the Strength of the Electromagnetic Interaction May Be Variable" under the supervision of Robert Dicke. He remained at Princeton for his whole career. Peebles was a Member in the School of Natural Sciences at the Institute for Advanced Study during the academic year 1977–78; he made subsequent visits during 1990–91 and 1998–99.

Academic career
Most of Peebles' work since 1964 has been in the field of physical cosmology to determine the origins of the universe. In 1964, there was very little interest in this field and it was considered a "dead end" but Peebles remained committed to studying it. Peebles has made many important contributions to the Big Bang model. With Dicke and others (nearly two decades after George Gamow, Ralph A. Alpher and Robert C. Herman), Peebles predicted the cosmic microwave background radiation. Along with making major contributions to Big Bang nucleosynthesis, dark matter, and dark energy, he was the leading pioneer in the theory of cosmic structure formation in the 1970s. Long before it was considered a serious, quantitative branch of physics, Peebles was studying physical cosmology and has done much to establish its respectability. Peebles said, "It was not a single step, some critical discovery that suddenly made cosmology relevant but the field gradually emerged through a number of experimental observations. Clearly one of the most important during my career was the detection of the cosmic microwave background (CMB) radiation that immediately attracted attention [...] both experimentalists interested in measuring the properties of this radiation and theorists, who joined in analyzing the implications".  His Shaw Prize citation states "He laid the foundations for almost all modern investigations in cosmology, both theoretical and observational, transforming a highly speculative field into a precision science."

Peebles has a long record of innovating the basic ideas, which would be extensively studied later by other scientists. For instance, in 1987, he proposed the primordial isocurvature baryon model for the development of the early universe. Similarly, Peebles contributed to establishing the dark matter problem in the early 1970s. Peebles is also known for the Ostriker–Peebles criterion, relating to the stability of galactic formation.

Peebles' body of work was recognized with him being named a 2019 Nobel Laureate in Physics, "for theoretical discoveries in physical cosmology"; Peebles shared half the prize with Michel Mayor and Didier Queloz who had been the first to discover an exoplanet around a main sequence star.

Peebles was elected as a member of the American Academy of Arts and Sciences in 1977 and a member of the National Academy of Sciences in 1988.

Honors 
 Awards

 Fellow of the American Physical Society (1964)
 Eddington Medal (1981)
 Heineman Prize (1982)
 Fellow of the Royal Society (1982)
 Henry Norris Russell Lectureship (1993)
 Bruce Medal (1995)
 Oskar Klein Medal (1997)
 Gold Medal of the Royal Astronomical Society (1998)
 Gruber Prize in Cosmology (2000), with Allan Sandage
 Harvey Prize (2001)
 Shaw Prize (2004)
 Member of the American Philosophical Society (2004)
 Crafoord Prize with James E. Gunn and Martin Rees (2005)
 Hitchcock Professorship (2006)
 Dirac Medal (2013)
 Member of the Order of Manitoba (2017)
 Nobel Prize in Physics (2019)
 Elected a Legacy Fellow of the American Astronomical Society in 2020.

 Named after him
 Asteroid 18242 Peebles

Publications 
 Peebles, J. P. E. (2009). Finding the Big Bang (1st ed.). Cambridge University Press.
 Peebles, P. J. E. (1980). Large-Scale Structure of the Universe. Princeton University Press.
 Peebles, P. J. E. (1992). Quantum Mechanics (1st Printing ed.). Princeton University Press.
 Peebles, P. J. E. (1993). Principles of Physical Cosmology (n ed.). Princeton University Press.
 Peebles, P. J. E. (2020). Cosmology’s Century. Princeton University Press.
 Peebles, P. J. E. (2022). The Whole Truth. Princeton University Press.

References

Footnotes

External links 

 Oral history interview transcript with Jim Peebles on 27 September 1984, American Institute of Physics, Niels Bohr Library & Archives - interview conducted by Martin Harwit at Princeton University
 Oral history interview transcript with Jim Peebles on 19 January 1988, American Institute of Physics, Niels Bohr Library & Archives - interview conducted by Alan Lightman in Princeton, New Jersey
 Oral history interview transcript with Jim Peebles on 4 April 2002, American Institute of Physics, Niels Bohr Library & Archives - Session I
 Oral history interview transcript with Jim Peebles on 5 April 2002, American Institute of Physics, Niels Bohr Library & Archives - Session II
 Bruce Medalists
 Personal Web page at Princeton University (Photos)
A Discussion on General Relativity by Students of John Wheeler and Bob Dicke, organized by Jim Peebles
 including the Nobel Lecture on Sunday 8 December 2019 How Physical Cosmology Grew

1935 births
Living people
20th-century American physicists
21st-century American physicists
21st-century Canadian astronomers
20th-century American astronomers
American astrophysicists
American Nobel laureates
Canadian astrophysicists
20th-century Canadian astronomers
Canadian emigrants to the United States
Canadian Nobel laureates
Canadian cosmologists
Companions of the Order of Canada
Fellows of the American Physical Society
Canadian Fellows of the Royal Society
Members of the Order of Manitoba
Foreign associates of the National Academy of Sciences
Nobel laureates in Physics
People from Princeton, New Jersey
People from Winnipeg
Princeton University alumni
Princeton University faculty
Recipients of the Gold Medal of the Royal Astronomical Society
Scientists from Manitoba
University of Manitoba alumni
Winners of the Dannie Heineman Prize for Astrophysics
Fellows of the American Astronomical Society
American agnostics
Canadian agnostics
Members of the American Philosophical Society